Karl (Kai) Reinhold Donner (1 April 1888 in Helsinki – 12 February 1935) was a Finnish linguist, ethnographer and politician. He carried out expeditions to the Ugric and Samodeic peoples in Siberia 1911–1914 and was docent of Uralic languages at the University of Helsinki from 1924. He was, among other things, a pioneer of modern anthropological fieldwork methods, though his work is little known in the English-speaking world.

Donner was the son of professor (later senator) Otto Donner, himself a noted philologist. Kai Donner studied Finno-Ugrian philology at the University of Helsinki from 1906. In 1909, he studied at Cambridge under James Frazer, A.C. Haddon, and W.H.R. Rivers at the same time as his better-known contemporary, Bronisław Malinowski.

Studying the Finno-Ugrian-speaking peoples of Siberia had become an important part of the "national sciences" — Finno-Ugrian philology and ethnology, folklore studies, and archaeology — that arose in answer to the interest in national "roots" that followed the "National Awakening" of the mid-19th century. Kai Donner had decided early on that he wanted to follow in the footsteps of pioneer philologist and explorer M.A. Castrén (1813–1852) and study the peoples who lived beyond the Urals. On his first trip (1911–1913) he traveled along the upper reaches of the Ob and most of the Yenisey. His second trip took him to the Ob, Irtysh, and upper Yenisei. Living with the Nenets and Khanty people, Donner studied not only the language but also the way of life and beliefs of his hosts. His travelogue, "Bland Samojeder i Sibirien åren 1911-1913, 1914" ("Among the Samoyeds in Siberia in the years 1911-1913, 1914"), was first printed in 1915.

During World War I, Donner was active in the Finnish independence movement which was secretly sending young men to Germany to receive military training in preparation for an armed struggle for independence from Imperial Russia. Betrayed to the Okhrana in 1916, he fled to Sweden and lived there and in Germany as a refugee until 1918. During the Finnish Civil War, Kai Donner served as commander of the Terijoki crossing helping among others former minister of war, Sukhomlinov, and grand-duke Cyril Romanoff and his family to escape from revolutionary Russia. He was also active as second in command to the newly established Finnish Military Intelligence. He was a close friend of general Mannerheim and wrote the first authoritative biography of Mannerheim.

In the 1920s and early 1930s he was one of the more influential leaders of the rightist Lapua Movement. Finland-Swedish by mother tongue, he expressed reservations about the persecution of Swedish speakers, which was commonly supported by conservative Finns in those decades.

He was the father of the Finnish politician and film producer Jörn Donner and geologist Joakim Donner. He is buried in the Hietaniemi Cemetery in Helsinki.

Notes

See also
Donner family

1888 births
1935 deaths
Politicians from Helsinki
Donner family
Finnish people of German descent
Linguists from Finland
Finnish Finno-Ugrists
Finnish explorers
Burials at Hietaniemi Cemetery
Finnish refugees
Refugees in Germany
Refugees in Sweden
20th-century linguists